Agustín Díaz (born 5 May 1988) is an Argentine professional footballer who plays as a midfielder for Agropecuario.

Career
Díaz began his senior career in 2006 with Talleres, making five appearances during the 2006–07 Primera B Nacional campaign. Three seasons later, in Torneo Argentino A, he scored his first goal for the club on 23 August 2009 in a home defeat to Juventud Unida Universitario; which was one of four goals in 2009–10. In 2015, after seventeen goals in one hundred and fifty-one league appearances, Díaz completed a loan move Godoy Cruz of the Argentine Primera División. He made his top-flight bow on 21 February during a 2–1 loss to Estudiantes. He was selected five more times for Godoy Cruz as they placed 22nd.

The 2016 Argentine Primera División season saw Díaz loaned to Atlético de Rafaela. Ten appearances followed. He returned to Talleres for 2016–17, but departed the club a year later without featuring to join Primera B Nacional's Agropecuario.

Career statistics
.

Honours
Talleres
 Torneo Argentino A: 2012–13

References

External links

1988 births
Living people
Sportspeople from Córdoba Province, Argentina
Argentine footballers
Association football midfielders
Primera Nacional players
Torneo Argentino A players
Torneo Federal A players
Argentine Primera División players
Talleres de Córdoba footballers
Godoy Cruz Antonio Tomba footballers
Atlético de Rafaela footballers
Club Agropecuario Argentino players